Emily May Madril (born July 1, 1999) is an American professional soccer player who plays as a defender for Orlando Pride of the National Women's Soccer League (NWSL).

Madril spent her collegiate career with the Florida State Seminoles and was part of the 2021 National Championship winning team before being drafted third overall in the 2023 NWSL Draft by Orlando Pride.

Early life
Madril was born in Boise, Idaho in 1999. Her family moved to Navarre, Florida in the summer of 2014. She attended Navarre High School where she tallied 107 goals and 70 assists for the soccer team and was honored with several individual awards including 2016 Florida Miss Soccer and twice Player of the Year by the Pensacola News Journal. She also played youth club soccer for Gulf Coast Texans.

Florida State Seminoles
Madril played three seasons of college soccer for the Seminoles at Florida State University between 2017 and 2021; she made a total of 62 appearances, starting 61, scoring six goals and registering seven assists. As a freshman she played in all 21 FSU games on the season, including 20 starts. On her collegiate debut she made two assists for Deyna Castellanos in a 3–0 win over the UNC Greensboro Spartans. She scored her first collegiate goal on October 5 in a 3–0 win over the Boston College Eagles. Madril redshirted for the 2018 season due to an ACL injury before being forced to sit out in 2019 with a second ACL tear. She returned in 2020 to start in all 16 games during the COVID-19 pandemic shortened season as FSU claimed both the ACC regular season and tournament titles. Individually Madril was named College Cup All-Tournament Team, All-ACC Second Team, United Soccer Coaches Second Team All-American. In 2021, Madril started all 25 games and played a team-high 2,306 minutes in her redshirt senior year, anchoring a back line that allowed 13 goals and kept 14 shutouts. The team finished second in the regular season standings behind the Virginia Cavaliers but defended their 2021 ACC women's soccer tournament title with a 1–0 victory over the Cavaliers before going on to win the 2021 National Championship title, beating the BYU Cougars on penalty kicks in the final. She earned College Cup All-Tournament Team, All-ACC First Team, ACC All-Tournament Team and United Soccer Coaches First Team All-American honors as well being named ACC Defensive Player of the Year. Having redshirted in 2018 and accrued an additional year of eligibility following the COVID-19 impacted season, Madril was permitted to play one more season of college soccer but announced she would forgo it and turn professional in August 2022 after feeling disrespected by the FSU administration following the head coach search.

Club career

Racing Louisville (W League)
Madril signed for the semi-professional USL W League affiliate of Racing Louisville FC in May 2022. She made nine appearances and scored four goals during the 2022 season and was named to the Best XI second team.

BK Häcken
After electing to forgo her final season at Florida State in early August 2022, partway through the 2022 NWSL season, Madril signed a professional contract directly with the NWSL on August 31, 2022. The move allowed Madril to retain her eligibility to have her playing rights distributed in the 2023 NWSL Draft and play in the 2023 NWSL season. In a statement, the league's Chief Legal Officer stated: "We are constantly evaluating our policies and procedures to ensure the NWSL is attracting and retaining the best players in the world." Having signed through 2025, Madril was loaned out to Swedish Damallsvenskan side BK Häcken FF for the remainder of the 2022 season. She made her senior club debut on September 14, 2022, starting and playing the full 90 minutes of a 3–0 Svenska Cupen third round victory over second division Jitex BK. She made a further four appearances, all in the league, scoring one goal in a 7–1 win over AIK. Despite being named as a substitute for both second qualifying round legs against Paris Saint-Germain, Madril did not appear in the UEFA Women's Champions League.

Orlando Pride
On January 12, 2023, Madril was selected in the first round (third overall) of the 2023 NWSL Draft by Orlando Pride.

International career
In March 2017, Madril was named to a United States under-19 training camp for the first time, one of only two college players on the roster. In January 2018, Madril was called up to an under-20 training camp ahead of the 2018 CONCACAF Women's U-20 Championship but she did not make the final roster. In February 2022, Madril was named to the under-23 squad for the 2022 Thorns Invitational. She returned to the under-23s to play in the Three-Nations Tournament hosted in Sweden in June 2022.

Personal life
Madril has a twin sister, Lizzy, who was a high school teammate with her at Navarre before playing college soccer at Daytona State College.

Career statistics

College summary

Club summary

Honors
Florida State Seminoles
Atlantic Coast Conference regular season: 2020
Atlantic Coast Conference Tournament: 2020, 2021
NCAA Women's College Cup: 2021

Individual
United Soccer Coaches First Team All-America: 2021
Atlantic Coast Conference Defensive Player of the Year

References

External links
 Florida State Seminoles profile
 

1999 births
Living people
People from Boise, Idaho
American women's soccer players
Women's association football defenders
Soccer players from Idaho
Florida State Seminoles women's soccer players
Orlando Pride draft picks
Orlando Pride players
BK Häcken FF players
Damallsvenskan players
American expatriate women's soccer players
Expatriate women's footballers in Sweden
American expatriate sportspeople in Sweden
Twin sportspeople